Hasanabad (also Romanized as Ḩasanābād) is a village in Panjak-e Rastaq Rural District, Kojur District, Nowshahr County, Mazandaran Province, Iran.

It is located on the Caspian Sea.

At the 2006 census, its population was 137, in 35 families.

References 

Populated places in Nowshahr County
Populated coastal places in Iran
Populated places on the Caspian Sea